Kossuth Rádió (formerly known as MR1-Kossuth Rádió, Radio Budapest and Budapest I.) is the national radio station of Hungary. It was established in 1925 as Budapest I. and named after Lajos Kossuth, a Hungarian national hero, in 1949.

The main Hungarian-language radio station can be heard all over Central Europe; Antenna Hungária broadcasts it with 2 MW power on 540 kHz AM from transmitter Solt (the most powerful medium wave transmitter in the world) and several FM stations, covering Hungary and the neighbouring countries.

It is the second most popular radio station in Hungary (as 2013) with 1.38 million listeners (14% of the total population) daily.

History 
It was established in 1925 as Budapest I. and broadcast from Csepel (then suburb of Budapest, now part of the city) with a 2 kW Telefunken-made transmitter on 565 metres AM. The first experimental programme began with this sentence: "Halló-halló! Itt a magyarországi rádióhírmondó 2 kW-os leadó állomása az 565 méteres hullámhosszon." ("Hallo-hallo! Here's the transmitter of the Hungarian radio broadcasting with 2 kW on 565 metres AM."). The first headquarters were built at Rákóczi Avenue and a new 3 kW tower was installed in 1926. At that time the radio was available only in and around Budapest.

National broadcasting started in 1928, when Csepel transmitter was replaced with the 20 kW-strong Lakihegy Tower. In the 1930s several new towers were built; Mosonmagyaróvár, Miskolc, Pécs, Nyíregyháza in 1932 and the new Lakihegy Tower with 120 kW (then the most powerful transmitter in the world) in 1933. New shows and programmes were launched continuously, the most popular was the Hungarian folk music in Gypsy style, heard after the noon bell. The radio station reached 300,000 listeners in 1933.

At the end of the World War II all Hungarian radio towers were exploded by the German army. Reconstruction finished in 1948 and Budapest I. was renamed to Kossuth Rádió after Lajos Kossuth in 1949, commemorating the 100th anniversary of the Hungarian revolution of 1848-1849. Lakihegy Tower was rebuilt again in 1968 with a new 300 kW transmitter, but it was getting out of date, so the government decided to build a much powerful tower. Transmitter Solt was finished in 1977 with 2000 kW as a high priority project with the cooperation of the Soviet Union. Nationwide FM transmitters built up in the 2000s and 2010s.

Shows 
The morning show called 180 perc ("180 minutes") is a three-hour-long news programme, with issues of public concern news and live discussions, economic and political analyses, and reports of our foreign correspondents.

The main news programme Krónika ("Chronicles") is the most listened radio news programme in the country for years. The other Chronicles are refreshed editions. The hourly newscast blocks constitute the frame of the daily programme flow. The station broadcasts news in every half an hour during the morning and afternoon drive-time slots.

In summer 2009 the most recent daily report programme A hely ("The Place") was launched, experimenting with the presentation of events, phenomenon, places and professions from a very insider perspective.

The programme Határok nélkül ("Without borders") was established after the fall of the Communism, focusing on the Hungarian diaspora living outside the present-day borders of Hungary due to the Treaty of Trianon. Subsidiaries of Magyar Rádió (MR) report from Bratislava, Uzhhorod, Arad, Târgu Mureș, Miercurea Ciuc, Oradea, Timișoara, Novi Sad, Subotica, Cluj-Napoca and Komárno.

There are several shows of ethnicity groups and religious communities of the country, including a Roman Catholic (Tanúim lesztek), Calvinist (Tebenned bíztunk eleitől fogva), Lutheran (Erős vár a mi Istenünk), Greek Catholic (Krisztus közöttünk), Methodist (Örüljetek az Úrban mindenkor), Baptist (Az Úr közel), Pentecostal (Békesség néktek), Unitarian (Egy az Isten), Jewish (Halljad Izrael) and a Romani (Jelenlét) programme.

Broadcasting 
Transmitter Solt (540 kHz, 2000 kW); the most powerful medium wave transmitter in the world. Kossuth Rádió can be heard all over Central Europe and all over Europe in the evening, as far as Kazan in Russia (~2,200 km).
47 FM transmitters nationwide, covering Hungary and the neighbouring territories.
Satellites Galaxy 19 and Optus D2 for Hungarian Americans and Hungarian Australians.
The station can be streamed online using Media player or web browser on MR1 Kossuth Radio Online.

See also
Lakihegy Tower
Magyar Televízió
Eastern Bloc information dissemination

References

Radio stations in Hungary
Hungarian-language radio stations
Radio stations established in 1925
Public radio
European Broadcasting Union members
Eastern Bloc mass media
Government-owned companies of Hungary
MTVA (Hungary)